Teach Me may refer to:

Films
Teach Me!, a short film by Mike Nichols

Music
Teach Me (Joey Badass song), single feat. Kiesza 2015
"Teach Me" (Bakermat song), 2014
"Teach Me", song by Jackie DeShannon, 1960
"Teach Me", song by Cory Marks from This Man, 2015
"Teach Me", song by Explosions (band) with Juanita Brooks  
"Teach Me", song by The Highway QCs, 1958
"Teach Me", song by Lowell Fulsom, 1971